De Vliegende Hollander ("The Flying Dutchman" in English) is a combination of a water coaster and a dark ride in amusement park Efteling in the Netherlands. The ride is based on the legend of Dutch man of war the Flying Dutchman.

Ride experience

The legend tells that Willem van der Decken, a captain of the Dutch East India Company (VOC, the first limited company), is a wealthy trader in command of the fastest ship of the VOC, named the "Hollander" (Dutchman). But greed takes control of him and secretly he starts practicing piracy. He recruits his crew from orphanages.

On Easter 1678, despite a heavy storm blowing into port, he sets sail for the Dutch East Indies. When all despair for this lack of fear for God, he proclaims: "I will sail, storm or not, Easter or not, prohibited or not. I will sail, even into eternity!" (Early Modern Dutch: "Ik zal vaeren, storm of gheen storm, Paesen of gheen Paesen, verbod of gheen verbod. Ik zal vaeren, al is het tot in den eeuwigheid!"). Against the wind, he sails toward damnation.

Visitors enter the house of Van der Decken while queueing. After walking through this abandoned house, the queue continues into the smugglers' tunnels, where Van der Decken's treasure can be seen hidden behind a small door. The tunnel ends in the cellar of a 17th-century style pub and the queue leads into a harbour at night.

In the harbor, the carriages are designed as small wooden boats, in which riders are seated below the water level throughout most of the ride. At the front of the boat is a lantern that acts as the only source of light for most the indoor experience. The lantern starts flickering, depending on the scene the riders are located in. The carriage holds a maximum of 14 riders at a time, arranged in 4 rows.

From the harbour, the boat goes into open sea through a simulated rainstorm. It meets a holographic ghost ship, the Flying Dutchman, and dives under its bow into the Underworld. Here, it halts, and a ghostly voice is heard stating: "You shall also sail until the end of time!" (Early Modern Dutch: "Ook Gij zult vaeren, tot het einde der tijden!") The barge is then towed to a height of 22,5 meters. Doors open and the barge shoots in a curved declination through a tunnel. After this some airtime in a bunny hop and an 85-degree horseshoe. A steep fall and a left curve bring the barge back into the water. A special technique allows for variation in the size of the "splash", thus preparing the ride for winter opening.

History
The music was composed by René Merkelbach and consists of 16 parts that are synchronous with the ride. The Prague philharmonic orchestra performed the music for the recording.

The ride was planned to go operational on April 16, 2006 Easter, exactly 328 years after the disappearance of the Flying Dutchman; due to construction problems the opening was postponed to April 1, 2007.

References

Official ride website

Water Coaster (roller coaster)
Dark rides
Roller coasters in the Netherlands
Efteling
Water rides
Roller coasters introduced in 2007
2007 establishments in the Netherlands
21st-century architecture in the Netherlands